Romans 4 is the fourth chapter of the Epistle to the Romans in the New Testament of the Christian Bible. It is authored by Paul the Apostle, while he was in Corinth in the mid-50s AD, with the help of an amanuensis (secretary), Tertius, who adds his own greeting in Romans 16:22. The focus of this chapter is on Abraham, whose faith "was accounted (or imputed) to him for righteousness" (Romans 4:3). The Geneva Bible's chapter summary states that "ten times in the chapter [Paul] beateth upon this word, Imputation.

Text
The original text was written in Koine Greek. This chapter is divided into 25 verses.

Textual witnesses
Some early manuscripts containing the text of this chapter are:
Papyrus 40 (~AD 250; extant verses 1–8)
Codex Vaticanus (325–350)
Codex Sinaiticus (330–360)
Codex Alexandrinus (400–440)
Codex Ephraemi Rescriptus (~450; complete)

Old Testament references
 Romans 4:3 references Genesis 15:6
 Romans 4:7–8 references Psalm 32:1–2
 Romans 4:17 references Genesis 17:5
 Romans 4:18 references Genesis 15:5
 Romans 4:22 references Genesis 15:6

Abraham's faith

Verse 3

Paul quotes the same verse in the same way in Galatians 3:6.

See also
 Abraham
 David
 Related Bible parts: Genesis 12, Genesis 15, Genesis 17, Genesis 22, Psalm 32, Isaiah 53, Galatians 3, Hebrews 11

References

Bibliography

External links 
 King James Bible - Wikisource
English Translation with Parallel Latin Vulgate
Online Bible at GospelHall.org (ESV, KJV, Darby, American Standard Version, Bible in Basic English)
Multiple bible versions at Bible Gateway (NKJV, NIV, NRSV etc.)

04